San Lorenzo is a Renaissance-style Roman Catholic parish church located in the town of Civitella del Tronto, in the province of Teramo, Abruzzo, Italy.

History
This church was dedicated to St Lawrence, and once stood outside of the town walls. During a siege in 1557, it served as a bastion of the defence. The façade has giant order pilasters with two central oculi: one above the rounded portal, and the other in the tympanum. In 1777, the interior was refurbished in a Baroque-style. The church has a single nave with two lateral chapels. The bell-tower is inserted between the transept and apse. The Baroque altars demonstrate 18th-century stucco decoration. The organ was built in 1707. The Sacristy has a wooden icon of St Ubaldo upholding the city as its patron. The church has a 16th-century canvases depicting respectively the Madonna del Rosary and a Visitation. There are also canvases depicting the Annunciation and a Deposition.

References

16th-century Roman Catholic church buildings in Italy
Renaissance architecture in Abruzzo
Baroque architecture in Abruzzo
Churches in the province of Teramo
Roman Catholic churches in Abruzzo